Marilyn Trenholme Counsell  (born October 22, 1933) is a Canadian lecturer, doctor and politician. Counsell was a Canadian Senator and Lieutenant Governor of New Brunswick from 1997 to 2003.

Early life and career

She was born in Baie Verte, New Brunswick, the daughter of Harry Frederick and Mildred (née Baxter) Trenholme. She married Kenneth Walter Counsell in 1972; they had two children, Giles Baxter Counsell and Lorna Joy Counsell. Kenneth Counsell died in 1981.

She has a BSc from Mount Allison University, MA in nutrition from University of Toronto and an MD from the University of Toronto. She worked first as a nutritionist for the Governments of New Brunswick and Ontario, and following her MD as a family physician at the Toronto General Hospital, and in Sackville and Port Elgin, New Brunswick.

She was elected member of the Legislative Assembly of New Brunswick for Tantramar in the 1987 General Election, reelected in 1991 and 1995. During this time, from 1994 to 1997, she also served in the cabinet as Minister of State for the Family and Minister of State for Family and Community Services.

Lieutenant-Governor of New Brunswick
She served as the 28th Lieutenant Governor of New Brunswick from 1997-2003. During her tenure, she reopened Old Government House, as "The People's House", and focused on early childhood literacy.

Senator
She was appointed to the Senate in 2003 by Governor General Adrienne Clarkson, on the advice of Prime Minister Jean Chrétien, and sat as a member of the Liberal caucus. As a Senator, she was an advocate for literacy, health and early childhood development. She reached the mandatory retirement age on October 22, 2008. In 2008, she began lecturing on Political Leadership in Canada at Mount Allison University. She was named to the Order of New Brunswick (ONB) that year (2008).

Honours and awards
In 1994 on behalf of the Province of New Brunswick she received a UN Year of the Family award. As the Lieutenant-Governor of New Brunswick, she was made a Dame Commander of the Order of St. John (DStJ). In June 2012, she was made an Officer of the Order of Canada (OC). She received honorary degrees from l'universite de Moncton, Mount Allison and University of New Brunswick and was also honoured with the Sir Charles Tupper Award for Political Action (CMA) and the Champion of Public Education Award (TLP).

Arms

References

External links
 Biography for the Senate of Canada

1933 births
Living people
Canadian general practitioners
New Brunswick Liberal Association MLAs
Members of the Executive Council of New Brunswick
Liberal Party of Canada senators
Canadian senators from New Brunswick
Lieutenant Governors of New Brunswick
Mount Allison University alumni
University of Toronto alumni
Members of the Order of New Brunswick
Women MLAs in New Brunswick
Women members of the Senate of Canada
Officers of the Order of Canada
Canadian women viceroys
21st-century Canadian politicians
21st-century Canadian women politicians
Women government ministers of Canada
20th-century Canadian politicians
20th-century Canadian women politicians